The RP-101 class of Harbour tugboats consists of 12 units (first batch) built for the Marina Militare, named as Rimorchiatore Portuale

Ships

References

External links 
 Ships Marina Militare website

Ships built in Italy
Auxiliary tugboat classes
Auxiliary ships of the Italian Navy